Rising Fawn is a small unincorporated community in the southern part of Dade County, Georgia, United States.  It is part of the Chattanooga, TN–GA Metropolitan Statistical Area. It is also the location of Cloudland Canyon State Park.

Rising Fawn was named after the child of a Cherokee Indian chieftain. The custom was to name the child after the first thing seen. On the following dawn, the chief saw a fawn rise from its bed and thought that he hadn't seen anything more beautiful. He then named his child Rising Fawn.

Geography

Rising Fawn is located in the northwestern part of Georgia, very close to the Alabama state line. Interstate 59 runs from southwest to northeast to the west of the community, leading northeast  to Chattanooga, Tennessee (via I-59 to I-24), and southwest  to Birmingham, Alabama. U.S. Route 11 also runs through the community, leading north  to Trenton, the county seat of Dade County, and southwest  to Hammondville, Alabama.

Notable people
Desmond Doss, Medal of Honor recipient from World War II portrayed in the 2016 film Hacksaw Ridge, resided in Rising Fawn for most of his life after the war, together with his wife Dorothy and their son Desmond Jr.
Silent film actress May Allison was born here in 1890.
MCPON Rick D. West.
Norman Blake, famed for his folk music, some of which was heard on the O Brother, Where Art Thou? soundtrack, resides in Rising Fawn with his wife, Nancy, also a folk musician.
Country Music Association's Vocal Group of the Year, the Forester Sisters are from Rising Fawn.
Colton Moore, at 24, was the youngest politician ever elected in Dade County and grew up in Rising Fawn.

References

Unincorporated communities in Dade County, Georgia
Unincorporated communities in Georgia (U.S. state)
Chattanooga metropolitan area
U.S. Route 11